Second childhood is an informal phrase used to describe adults whose declining mental capabilities mean that they need care similar to that of children. It is an unscientific term, similar in meaning to the old terms dotage or senility. The current scientific term is senile dementia.

Second childhood may also refer to:

 Second Childhood, a 1976 album by Phoebe Snow
 Second Childhood (film), a 1936 film in the Our Gang series
 A Second Childhood, a 2010 Italian drama film

English-language idioms